CKNC-FM is a radio station in Simcoe, Ontario, broadcasting on 99.7 MHz with an classic hits format branded as Oldies 99.7. The station is owned by My Broadcasting Corporation, who first applied to operate a second station in Simcoe on June 9, 2017. The CRTC approved the application, and CKNC signed on the air on September 1, 2017, with the first song being The Rolling Stones' hit Start Me Up.

Notes
The CKNC callsign was used at a television station 
in Sudbury, Ontario from 1971 until 2002. CKNC was also the original callsign, in the 1920s and 1930s, of a radio station in Toronto that now uses the callsign CJBC.

References

External links 
 Oldies 99.7
 

Knc
Knc
Radio stations established in 2017
2017 establishments in Ontario
Knc
Norfolk County, Ontario